Ach is a surname. Notable people with the surname include:

Manfred Ach (born 1940), German politician
Narziß Ach (1871–1946), German psychologist and university lecturer

See also
Bach (surname)